"Hola Señorita" is a song by Congolese-French singer and rapper Maître Gims. It was released as a single from the reissue of his album "Ceinture noire", "Transcendance". The song is partly in Spanish and features vocals from Colombian singer Maluma. A music video for the song was released on 12 May 2019 featuring Leyna Zniber. The song peaked at number 15 in France.

Music video 
The song's accompanying music video was shot in Morocco and was released on 10 May 2019. The video garnered 26 million views after a week of its release. It received 435 million views as of July 2021.

Charts

Certifications

References 

2019 singles
2019 songs
Maluma songs
Songs written by Renaud Rebillaud
Gims songs